Mazzoncini is a surname. Notable people with the surname include:

 Alberto Mazzoncini (born 1991), South African cricketer
 David Mazzoncini (born 1971), French footballer
 Renato Mazzoncini (born 1968), CEO and COO of Italian Railway holding company Ferrovie dello Stato Italiane Spa